Coluccio Salutati (16 February 1331 – 4 May 1406) was an Italian humanist and notary, and one of the most important political and cultural leaders of Renaissance Florence; as chancellor of the Republic and its most prominent voice, he was effectively the permanent secretary of state in the generation before the rise of the Medici.

Early career
Salutati was born in Stignano, a tiny commune near Buggiano (today's province of Pistoia, Tuscany). After studies in Bologna, where his father lived in exile after a Ghibelline coup in Buggiano, the family returned to Buggiano, which had become more securely part of the Republic of Florence. There he worked as notary and pursued his literary studies, coming into contact with the Florentine humanists Boccaccio and Francesco Nelli. The refined and masterful classical Latin of his letters to Florentine scholars earned him the admiring nickname of "Ape of Cicero", In 1367 Coluccio was  appointed chancellor of Todi in the Papal States. Papal secretary Francesco Bruni took Salutati with him to Rome from 1368 to 1370, as assistant in the Papal curia of Pope Urban V recently returned from Avignon. In 1370, through his connections in the curia he was made chancellor of the powerful Tuscan city of Lucca, a post he quickly lost in internecine struggles there.

Chancellor of Florence

In 1374 Coluccio received an appointment in Florence and the following year was appointed Chancellor of Florence, the most important position in the bureaucracy of the Florentine Republic. In his position, Salutati was responsible for the widely circulated official correspondences with other states, drafting confidential instructions to ambassadors, conducting diplomacy and negotiating treaties: "in its chancellor Florence had someone truly exceptional, endowed not only with legal knowledge, political cunning and diplomatic skill, but also with psychological penetration, a gift for public relations, and unusual literary skill." His abilities as a statesman were soon tested as Florence was immediately faced with war with the papacy. Salutati was charged with addressing Pope Gregory XI to assure him that Florence was still a loyal member of the Guelf party. Although he failed to prevent war with the papacy, Salutati soon became the most celebrated chancellor in all of Italy and a master of the formal letter. Florence's principal nemesis during his tenure, Gian Galeazzo Visconti, Duke of Milan, once remarked that one of Salutati's letters could "cause more damage than a thousand Florentine horsemen." During his life, Florence warred twice against its powerful northern rival, Giangaleazzo Visconti. His treatise De tyranno ("On the tyrant") published in 1400, has, most likely, its model in Visconti, although in it Salutati (despite being a republican) remains a supporter of the providential universal monarch already put forward by Dante. Occasionally his letters had unintended consequences. When he wrote to the people of Ancona in 1376, inciting them, in the name of their freedom, to revolt against the governor imposed by the pope, he called to mind the evils Italy had suffered on behalf of the French. Word of his nasty tone got to the King of France, which prompted a most conciliatory letter from Salutati, assuring the King that he meant no harm and that Florence would always be a friend to France.

In testimony to his service as chancellor the city of Florence paid 250 florins for his funeral in 1406.

Cultural achievements

Coluccio's cultural achievements are perhaps even greater than his political ones. A skilled writer and orator, Coluccio drew heavily upon the classical tradition and developed a powerful prose style based on the Latin of Virgil and Cicero: "I have always believed," Salutati wrote, "I must imitate antiquity not simply to reproduce it, but in order to produce something new". In this sense his own view of humanism was broader-based than the antiquarianism of the generation of humanists he fostered.

An admiring correspondent of Petrarch, he spent much of his salary on amassing a collection of 800 books, slightly less than his contemporary Niccolò de' Niccoli. He also pursued classical manuscripts, making a number of important discoveries, the most important being Cicero's lost Letters to his Friends (Epistulae ad Familiares), which showed Cicero as a defender of republican liberty.  Coluccio also did important studies of history, tying Florence's origin not to the Roman Empire but to the Roman Republic.

He promoted the work of younger humanists such as Gian Francesco Poggio Bracciolini, Niccolò de' Niccoli, Leonardo Bruni and Pier Paolo Vergerio.

He also brought the Byzantine scholar Manuel Chrysoloras to Florence in 1397 to teach one of the first courses in Greek since the end of the Roman Empire. After Boethius, few Westerners spoke or read Greek. Many ancient Greek works of science and philosophy were not available in Latin translation. By Salutati's time, a few Latin texts of Aristotle had arrived in Europe via Muslim Spain and Sicily. These texts, however, had been translated from Arabic, rather than directly from the Greek. By bringing Chrysoloras to Florence, Salutati made it possible for a select group of scholars (including Bruni and Vergerio) to read Aristotle and Plato in the original ancient Greek.

References

External links
 Salutati in the Bibliotheca Augustana

1331 births
1406 deaths
People from the Province of Pistoia
Italian Renaissance writers
Italian politicians
14th-century Italian philosophers